The 1927 Howard Bulldogs football team was an American football team that represented Howard College (now known as the Samford University) as a member of the Southern Intercollegiate Athletic Association (SIAA) during the 1927 college football season. In their first year under head coach Chester Dillon, the team compiled a 7–2–2 record. Their victory over Birmingham–Southern was played as the first game hosted at Legion Field.

Schedule

References

Howard
Samford Bulldogs football seasons
Howard Bulldogs football